The 2019–20 Tanzanian Premier League (known as the Vodacom Premier League for sponsorship reasons) is the 55th season of the Tanzanian Premier League, the top-tier football league in Tanzania (mainland only), since its establishment in 1965. The season started on 24 August 2019.

The match between the Young Africans and Simba SC drew an attendance of 58,400, the highest in the league.

League table

Relegation play-offs

Semi-finals

First leg

Second leg

References

Tanzanian Premier League
Tanzanian Premier League
Tanzanian Premier League
Tanzania